Saint-Mard (Gaumais: Sié-Mâ) is a village of Wallonia and a district of the municipality of Virton, located in the province of Luxembourg, Belgium.

A Roman settlement was established here in the first century AD. During the Middle Ages, the village belonged the County of Luxemburg. The centre of the village contains the Neo-Romanesque village church, built between 1864 and 1867. In the outskirts of the village, in the direction of Virton, lies the Church of Vieux-Virton, which traces its origins to the late 7th or early 8th century, though the oldest parts of the present building are from the 13th century.

People
  (1890–1961), Belgian painter, born in Saint-Mard

References

External links

Former municipalities of Luxembourg (Belgium)